Rashash  is a Hebrew acronym that refers to either of the two following rabbis: 

 Shalom Sharabi, Yemenite Halakhist and Kabbalist 
 Samuel Strashun, Lithuanian Talmudist